Dušan Tittel (born 27 December 1966) is a former Slovak professional footballer, who played internationally for Czechoslovakia (11 caps) and Slovakia (44 caps, 7 goals). He was elected three times Slovakia player of the year.

International goals
Scores and results list Slovakia's goal tally first, score column indicates score after each Tittel goal.

Honours

Player
Slovan Bratislava
Corgoň Liga: 1993–94, 1994–95, 1995–96
Slovak Cup: 1989, 1994, 1997, 1998
Slovak Super Cup: 1993, 1994

Omonia
Cypriot First Division: 2000–01
Cypriot Super Cup: 2001

Individual
Slovak Footballer of the Year: 1995, 1996, 1997
Slovak Top Eleven (6): 1993, 1994, 1995, 1996, 1997, 1998

Manager
Slovan Bratislava
Slovak Cup: 2009–10

References

External links
 Dušan Tittel – Official site
 Profile on Slovak federation site
 

1966 births
Living people
People from Námestovo
Sportspeople from the Žilina Region
Slovak footballers
Czechoslovak footballers
Association football defenders
Slovakia international footballers
Czechoslovakia international footballers
Dual internationalists (football)
Slovak Super Liga players
Ligue 1 players
Cypriot First Division players
ŠK Slovan Bratislava players
FC Spartak Trnava players
Nîmes Olympique players
AC Omonia players
ŠK Slovan Bratislava managers
Slovak football managers
Slovak expatriate footballers
Czechoslovak expatriates in France
Expatriate footballers in France
Slovak expatriate sportspeople in Cyprus
Expatriate footballers in Cyprus
Members of the National Council (Slovakia) 2016-2020